Strictly Ballroom is the original soundtrack of the 1992 Golden Globe-nominated film Strictly Ballroom starring Paul Mercurio, Tara Morice, Barry Otto and Pat Thomson. The original score was composed by David Hirschfelder.

The album won the BAFTA Award for Best Original Film Score.

At the ARIA Music Awards of 1993, the album was nominated for Best Original Soundtrack, Cast or Show Album.

Track listing
"Love Is In The Air" (Ballroom Mix) performed by John Paul Young
"Perhaps Perhaps Perhaps" (Quizas Quizas Quizas) performed by Doris Day
"La Cumparsita/Tango Please" (Medley) performed by David Hirschfelder & The Bogo Pogo Orchestra
"Tequila/Sinful Samba" (Medley) performed by David Hirschfelder & The Bogo Pogo Orchestra
"Rhumba de Burros" performed by Ignatius Jones
"Doug's Tearful Waltz/First Kiss" performed by David Hirschfelder & The Bogo Pogo Orchestra
"Time After Time" performed by Mark Williams & Tara Morice
"Standing in the Rain" performed by John Paul Young/David Hirschfelder & The Bogo Pogo Orchestra
"Yesterday's Hero" performed by Ignatius Jones
"The Blue Danube" performed by David Hirschfelder & The Bogo Pogo Orchestra
"Scott & Fran's Paso Doble" performed by David Hirschfelder & The Bogo Pogo Orchestra

Chart performance

Weekly chart

Year-end charts

Certifications

References

1992 soundtrack albums
Romance film soundtracks
Comedy film soundtracks